Kahler may refer to:

Places
Kahler, Luxembourg, a small town in the commune of Garnich
Kahler Asten, a German mountain range

Other uses
Kahler (surname)
Kahler's disease, a cancer otherwise known as multiple myeloma
Kahler Tremolo System, a type of bridge hardware for electric guitars
Kahler v. Kansas, a 2019 United States Supreme Court case

See also
Kähler (disambiguation)